Transverse rotor aircraft have two large horizontal rotor assemblies mounted side by side.

Single-rotor helicopters (unicopters) need an additional tail rotor or tail exhaust to neutralize the reactional angular momentum produced by the main rotor.  Transverse rotor helicopters, however, use counter-rotating rotors, with each cancelling out the other's torque.  Counter-rotating rotor blades also won't collide with and destroy each other if they flex into the other rotor's pathway.  In addition, transverse rotor configuration has the advantage of higher payload with shorter blades, since there are two sets working to provide lift.  Also, all of the power from the engines can be used for lift, whereas a single-rotor helicopter must divert part of its engine power to generate tail thrust.

Transverse rotor design with rotatable nacelles are known as tiltrotors while designs where the whole wing rotates are known as tiltwings.

List of transverse rotor aircraft

Transverse-mounted helicopters
 Bratukhin B-11 (1948)
 Bratukhin G-3 (1946)
 Cierva W.5 (1938)
 Cierva W.11 Air Horse (1948) - a three rotor helicopter
 Firth Helicopter (1952)
 Focke-Achgelis Fa 223 Drache (1941)
 Focke-Wulf Fw 61 (1936)
 Kamov Ka-22 (1959)
 Kamov V-100 (1980s) - unbuilt project
 Landgraf H-2 (1944)
 McDonnell XHJH Whirlaway (1946)
 Mil Mi-12 (1967)
 Platt-LePage XR-1 (1941)

Transverse-mounted tiltrotors
 AgustaWestland AW609
 Bell Eagle Eye
 Bell XV-3
 Bell XV-15
 Bell Boeing V-22 Osprey

Transverse-mounted tiltwings
 Canadair CL-84 Dynavert

See also

 Coaxial rotors
 Intermeshing rotors
 Rotorcraft
 Tandem rotors
 Tiltrotor

Helicopter components